The 2014–15 Sheffield Shield season was the 113th season of the Sheffield Shield, the domestic first-class cricket competition of Australia. It was held after the conclusion of the Matador BBQs One-Day Cup and included a break halfway through for the entirety of the Big Bash League. Trials for day/night Tests with the pink ball continued from the previous season. This season introduced a new bonus point system based on the runs scored and wickets taken in the first 100 overs of both teams' first innings. Due to Australia and New Zealand hosting the 2015 Cricket World Cup, several matches in the later rounds could not be held at the usual home grounds of the teams. 
The final was contested between Victoria and Western Australia. Due to the final of the World Cup being held at the MCG, Victoria, who earned the right to host the final by finishing on top of the ladder, had to choose an alternative ground. They opted for Bellerive Oval in Hobart. The final was drawn, meaning Victoria won their 29th title by finishing on top of the table. Adam Voges was the leading run-scorer and was named man of the series, while Fawad Ahmed took the most wickets of the season. Round 4 was marred by the death of Phillip Hughes on 27 November 2014 after he got hit in the neck by a bouncer two days earlier.

Points table

Round-Robin stage

Round 1

Round 2

Round 3

Round 4
The match between South Australia and New South Wales was abandoned after a hit to the head left Phillip Hughes in critical condition. The other matches in this round were abandoned before play on Day 2 as Hughes' condition remained unchanged. Hughes died on 27 November.

Round 5
Matches were originally scheduled for 5 to 8 December.

Round 6

Round 7

Round 8

Round 9

Round 10

Final

Statistics

Most runs

Most wickets

References

External links
 Sheffield Shield 2014/15 on ESPN Cricinfo
 Bupa Sheffield Shield on Cricket Australia

Sheffield Shield
Sheffield Shield
Sheffield Shield seasons